Milano is the Italian name of Milan, one of the largest cities in Italy.

Milano may also refer to:

Places
El Milano, a village and municipality in western Spain
Milano, Texas, a city in the United States
Milano Hotel in Gualala, California, U.S.

Brands and organizations
Milano (cookie), a trademarked dessert
Milano, the brand name used by the Pizza Express restaurant chain in Ireland
Milano School of Management, Policy, and Environment, a public policy and management school located in New York City
Alfa Romeo 75, which is sold in North America as the Milano
VienneMilano, an American hosiery brand and online boutique

Popular culture
The Milano, a spacecraft owned by Peter Quill / Star-Lord in the film Guardians of the Galaxy
Milano (album), by Italian composer Daniele Luppi and American rock band Parquet Courts
Milano (newspaper), published in Milan from 1640 to 1768
Easy Milano, a fortnightly magazine for the English speaking community of Milan
Milano Films, an early 20th century Italian film production company

Sports
FK Milano Kumanovo, a football club in North Macedonia
Milano Seamen, an American football club based in Milan
Olimpia Milano, an Italian basketball team
Power Volley Milano, an Italian volleyball team
Scuderia Milano, a former Formula 1 constructor

Other
Milano (given name)
Milano (surname)
Milano, a later name of the US Liberty ship SS M. Michael Edelstein
 Volkswagen Milano, a 3 door concept electric taxicab revealed in 2010

See also
Milan (disambiguation)